Otteissa sericea is a species of beetle in the family Cerambycidae, and the only species in the genus Otteissa. It was described by Pascoe in 1864.

References

Dorcasominae
Beetles described in 1864
Monotypic beetle genera